In the 1978 Independence Bowl, the East Carolina Pirates defeated the Louisiana Tech Bulldogs .

Game summary
The East Carolina Pirates forced four fumbles and intercepted Louisiana Tech Bulldogs quarterback Eric Barkley three times en route to victory.  ECU took control of the game early, scoring twice in the first quarter.  The Pirates pushed their lead to 21-0 on a touchdown run early in the second quarter.  The Bulldogs answered less than two minutes later with a 32-yard touchdown strike. Tech cut the lead to 21-10 with a 36-yard field goal less than a minute before the end of the half.  Tech's Swilley kicked another 36-yard field goal six minutes into the third quarter. Pirate running back Theodore Sutton ran 45 yards for a touchdown with seven minutes remaining in the quarter. The Pirates scored another touchdown late in the game.  ECU totaled 278 yards rushing, while holding the Bulldogs to 12 yards on the ground.

Scoring summary

Statistics

References

Independence Bowl
Independence Bowl
East Carolina Pirates football bowl games
Louisiana Tech Bulldogs football bowl games
December 1978 sports events in the United States
1978 in sports in Louisiana